Dongqiao (Ningbo dialect: don3jio1), is a town in Yinzhou District, Ningbo, Zhejiang, People's Republic of China. There are many factories in the area, including a plastic factory in Shagang Village.

Administrative divisions
, Dongqiao has 1 residential community (社区) and 20 villages under its administration:

See also
List of township-level divisions of Zhejiang

References

Towns of Zhejiang
Yinzhou District, Ningbo